Craig Edward Disley (born 24 August 1981) is an English football coach and former professional footballer who is assistant manager at Cleethorpes Town.

Primarily a box-to-box central midfielder, he began his professional career at Mansfield Town in 1999 where he started as a youngster, and established himself in the "Stags" first team in the 2001–02 season, helping them gain promotion into the Second Division. He then decided to join Bristol Rovers in July 2004, and helped the "Gas" to win promotion out of League Two in the 2007 Football League Two play-off Final. Deemed surplus to requirements, he joined Shrewsbury Town in May 2009, but injury problems through no fault of his own meant he didn't hold a regular place in the team. He joined Grimsby Town in June 2011, and became a linchpin in their midfield over the next 5 years, helping Grimsby to win promotion out of the National League in the 2016 National League play-off Final at Wembley Stadium. Having been released by Grimsby after a successful 6 years with the club, he joined Alfreton Town in the National League North for the next two years.

Playing career

Mansfield Town
Born in Worksop, Nottinghamshire, Disley came through the youth ranks at Mansfield Town, and was promoted to the club's first team in the summer of 1999 under the management of Bill Dearden. He made his debut on 23 September 1999 in a 4–0 victory over Shrewsbury Town, coming on as a 67th-minute substitute for Michael Sissons, also picking up his 1st yellow card within 3 minutes. He went on to make a further five appearances in his first season at Field Mill.

During the 2001–02 season Disley scored his first and second career goals in a 2–3 away win over Cheltenham Town on 25 August 2001, Liam Lawrence providing both corners as Disley opened the scoring for the Stags in the 29th minute with a header, before adding a second in the 47th minute with another header. Disley earned promotion into the Second Division with Mansfield in 2001–02 under the stewardship of Stuart Watkiss. By the end of the 2002–03 season Mansfield had been relegated back down to the fourth tier of English football.

Bristol Rovers
Disley signed with Bristol Rovers in July 2004 on a two-year contract. The midfielder became a major part of the promotion campaign during the 2006–07 season and his good form continued into the 2007–08 season, when he scored nine times, including last-minute winners against Oldham Athletic and at Millwall.

Shrewsbury Town
On 5 May 2009, Disley was told that he was free to talk to other clubs as Bristol Rovers deemed him surplus to requirements. On 4 June he signed for Shrewsbury Town on a two-year contract. On 22 February 2010, Disley broke his ankle, which ruled him out for the rest of the 2009–10 season.

He was released on 23 May 2011, after two years with Shrewsbury.

Grimsby Town
On 23 June 2011, Conference Premier side Grimsby Town announced they had offered Disley a contract. On 24 June, he completed move to Grimsby a two-year contract. On 15 October 2011, Disley scored his first goal for Grimsby in the 2–1 defeat at York City, a cross from Rob Duffy for Disley to loop a firm header over keeper Michael Ingham on four minutes, he also acquired his 4th yellow card of the season after a poor challenge on Jason Walker.

On 11 August 2012, Disley scored the opening goal of the season for Grimsby in the 1–1 draw against Southport on 74 minutes, an Aswad Thomas cross from the left by-line was parried by goalkeeper McMillan straight into the path of Disley, scoring from close range.

Disley's goal tally reached double figures in the 2013–14 season and he was Grimsby's second top scorer, with 11 league goals, and a goal in the 3–2 FA Cup defeat to Huddersfield Town. He also scored against Gateshead in both legs of the play-off semi finals, however this was not enough to prevent Gateshead progressing to the final.

He missed just two league games of the 2014–15 season and he was Grimsby's third top scorer, with nine league goals as Paul Hurst's Grimsby came third in the Conference Premier, and secured a play-off spot.

On 26 May 2015, Disley was the first player commit his future to Grimsby for the 2015–16 season, signing a new one-year deal. Disley played in Grimsby's 3–1 victory over Forest Green Rovers in the 2016 National League play-off Final at Wembley Stadium, seeing Grimsby promoted into League Two after a six-year absence from the Football League.

On 27 May 2016, Disley agreed to a new one-year contract with the newly promoted club.

After making 32 appearances and scoring three goals for Grimsby in the 2016–17 season he was released by the club on 9 May 2017. Grimsby Town director John Fenty released a statement following Disley's release; he said: "The club will be arranging a special benefit (testimonial) game for Craig in due course, an opportunity for good many like-minded fans to have the opportunity express their respect for a true Town legend."

On 1 November 2017 Disley and his All Star team were defeated 7–2 by the current Grimsby Town team in his testimonial game. Disley's team included former Town players such as Shaun Pearson, Lenell John-Lewis, Liam Hearn, Aristote Nsiala, Nathan Arnold and Michael Boulding. With goals coming from Disley himself and Ross Hannah.

Alfreton Town
Disley signed for National League North side Alfreton Town on a two-year deal on 1 June 2017. Manager John McDermott said: "It was a fantastic signing for us and we fought off stiff competition from higher clubs to land his signature."

On 7 August 2018 Disley signed for Cleethorpes Town on season-long loan.

Barton Town
Disley signed for Barton Town at the start of the 2019–20 season.

On 12 June 2021, Disley announced his retirement from football.

Coaching career
In the summer of 2018 as well as his playing duties Disley began coaching the U16 team at former club Grimsby Town.

On 19 November 2022, Disley returned to Cleethorpes Town as assistant manager to his former Grimsby team mate Nathan Arnold.

Style of play
An energetic box-to-box central midfielder with a good engine who can contribute with goals, he can also play out in a wider midfield position.

Career statistics

Honours

Player
Mansfield Town
Third Division third-place promotion: 2001–02

Bristol Rovers
League Two play-offs: 2007

Grimsby Town
National League play-offs: 2016
FA Trophy runner-up: 2015–16
Lincolnshire Senior Cup: 2011–12, 2012–13, 2014–15

Individual
Conference Premier Team of the Year: 2012–13, 2013–14, 2014–15
National League Player of the Month: March 2016

References

External links

Craig Disley profile at the official Grimsby Town F.C. website

1981 births
Living people
Footballers from Worksop
English footballers
Association football midfielders
Mansfield Town F.C. players
Bristol Rovers F.C. players
Shrewsbury Town F.C. players
Grimsby Town F.C. players
Alfreton Town F.C. players
Cleethorpes Town F.C. players
Barton Town F.C. players
Grimsby Town F.C. non-playing staff
English Football League players
National League (English football) players
Northern Counties East Football League players